League tables for teams participating in Vitonen, the sixth highest league in the Finnish Soccer League system, in 2009.

2009 League tables

Helsinki

Section 1

Section 2

Note: Cosmos AP Withdrew

Section 3

Promotion Playoffs

Section Winners play-offs

Uusimaa

Section 1

Section 2

Section 3

Section 4

South-East Finland (Kaakkois-Suomi)

South Section

North Section

Eastern Finland (Itä-Suomi)

Section A

Section B

Section C

Promotion Playoffs

Central Finland (Keski-Suomi)

Northern Finland (Pohjois-Suomi)

Oulu

Central Ostrobothnia (Keski-Pohjanmaa)

Vaasa

Satakunta

Note: FC Eurajoki and FC HaPo Withdrew

Tampere

Section 1

Section 2

Section 3

Turku and Åland (Turku and Ahvenanmaa)

Upper Section - Summer

Lower Section - Summer

Upper Section - Autumn

Lower Section - Autumn

Footnotes

References and sources
Finnish FA
ResultCode

2009
6